Gig or GIG may refer to:

Arts and entertainment
 Gig (Circle Jerks album) (1992)
 Gig (Northern Pikes album) (1993)
 The Gig, a 1985 film written and directed by Frank D. Gilroy
 GIG (Hot Wheels AcceleRacers), a character
 "GUYS Is Green" ("G.I.G.!"), in the Japanese television series Ultraman Mebius
 KGIG-LP ("104.9 The Gig"), an FM radio station licensed to Modesto, California, US

Transportation
 Gig (boat), or "captain′s gig", a boat used on naval ships as the captain's taxi
 Gig (carriage), a two-wheeled sprung cart to be pulled by a horse
 Cornish pilot gig, a six-oared rowing boat
 Rio de Janeiro–Galeão International Airport (IATA airport code), the main airport serving Rio de Janeiro, Brazil
 Giggleswick railway station (National Rail station code), Yorkshire, England
 Gig Car Share, a carsharing service in parts of the San Francisco Bay Area

Science and technology
 Gigabyte (colloquial gig), a computer unit of information
 Global Information Grid, a military global information network operated by the United States Department of Defense
 Generalized inverse Gaussian distribution, a distribution in probability theory

People
 Gig Gangel (born 1958), Playboy Playmate of the Month for January 1980
 Gig Morton (born 1996), Canadian actor
 Gig Ryan (born 1956), Australian poet born Elizabeth Anne Martina Ryan
 Gig Young (1913–1978), American actor born Byron Elsworth Barr

Other uses
 Gig-mill, a machine for the gigging of textiles that produce a fibrous and soft surface.
 Georgian Industrial Group, a holding company in Georgia
 Gig, temporary work for a specified time
 Gig, a multi-pronged spear used in gigging or hunting fish or small game
 Gig, the blade a professional wrestler uses to cut himself; See List of professional wrestling terms
 GIG Cymru, the Welsh-language name for NHS Wales

See also
 Gig economy, the economy of those in temporary work
 Gigg (disambiguation)
 Giggs (disambiguation)